Maidens' Vow (Traditional Chinese: 鳳凰四重奏) is a TVB drama series broadcast in August 2006. It won acclaim for its unique format of depicting four different generations of the same lineage but which have very few cross-generational interactions. (None on-screen, and few in the plot) The four generations also depict distinctly different cultural and historical settings. (Traditional late Qing dynasty, Chinese revolutionary era, 1970s Hong Kong, 2000s Hong Kong)

Its name roughly translates as "The Phoenix Quartet's Melody".

Synopsis
The drama centers around a restaurant owned by four generations of women.

First generation
1880 - 1905: Ngai Yu-Fung (Charmaine Sheh), who was married to a good-for-nothing husband Wang Yuk-Lun (Sammul Chan). Lun gambled away their family's assets and cheated on his wife numerous times. Lun also was always suspicious about the relationship about Yu-Fung and Yu-Chi, even though they were always telling the truth, but of course, the good-for-nothing never believed it. However, Fung remained faithful to her husband, despite her and Yu-Chi (Joe Ma)'s enduring love. Fung eventually became pregnant and had a daughter with Lun. The first story ends tragically, with Fung dying with her longtime lover Chi in a train accident.

Second generation
1919 - 1925: Fung and Lun's daughter Wang Chi-Kwun (Charmaine Sheh). She fell in love with her teacher, Li Kat-Cheung (Joe Ma), and they eventually eloped to Tianjin. Though they were very poor, they were still happy because they could be together. Her husband, who had studied to become a doctor, had to work in coal mines to support the family. The owner of the coal mines didn't care about the safety of the workers at all, and the death of a good friend spurred her husband to support the Revolution. Chi-Kwun was separated from her husband and eventually returned to her home to help run the family restaurant. After two years with no news from her husband, he suddenly resurfaced, working for the Japanese. However, it turned out he was actually a double agent, and still fighting for the Revolution. He was found out and they fled for their lives, spending an unforgettable last night on the train together, before they had to part ways again. Chi-Kwun became pregnant with their child, and continued to run the family restaurant. She waited for him for the rest of her life, and died of old age.

Third generation
1967 - 1982: Bak Wai-Jan (Charmaine Sheh), the grand daughter of Kwun. Jan married Dai Lap-Yan (Joe Ma), who was firmly convinced that women should stay at home while the men worked to support the family. Wai-Jan became bored with staying at home all the time and decided to work in an advertising company without letting Lap-Yan know. However, he eventually found out, and their relationship went through a lot of turbulence. In the end, Wai-Jan made Lap-Yan switch roles with her to teach him a lesson, and showed him how hard it was to have to work and keep up with chores at home. Lap-yan learned his lesson and had a daughter with Wai-Jan. They immigrated to the United States in search of a better life, but unfortunately Wai-Jan and Lap-Yan both died in an earthquake in San Francisco.

Fourth generation
2003 - 2006: Dai Sze-Ka (Charmaine Sheh), Wai-Jan and Lap-Yan's daughter. She is hard-working and independent, and believes that only fools get married. Though she has had many boyfriends, one thing remains in common with all of them - they always go missing before New Year's and then break up with her soon after. Meanwhile, Fong Ka-On (Joe Ma), a successful accountant, is stood up at the altar by his fiancée. The two of them spend New Year's Eve together and had a one-night stand. However, they fell in love and eventually moved in together, but due to their differences and several misunderstandings, broke up again. Sze-Ka eventually gave birth to a baby boy, but did not have a chance to tell Ka-On during her pregnancy, and decided to raise the child herself with the help of her friend Sheung Yat-Kat (Sammul Chan). Sze-Ka reopens the restaurant that her great-great-grandmother opened and became famous due to her cooking books and Ka-On tries to marry her again...

Cast

First generation

Second generation

Third generation

Fourth generation

Viewership ratings

Accolades

References

External links
TVB.com Maidens' Vow - Official Website 

TVB dramas
2006 Hong Kong television series debuts
2006 Hong Kong television series endings